A total solar eclipse occurred at the Moon's descending node on June 19, 1936 (June 18, 1936 east of the International Date Line). A solar eclipse occurs when the Moon passes between Earth and the Sun, thereby totally or partly obscuring the image of the Sun for a viewer on Earth. A total solar eclipse occurs when the Moon's apparent diameter is larger than the Sun's, blocking all direct sunlight, turning day into darkness. Totality occurs in a narrow path across Earth's surface, with the partial solar eclipse visible over a surrounding region thousands of kilometres wide.
The path of totality crossed Europe and Asia. The full phase could be seen in Greece, Turkey, USSR, China and the Japanese island of Hokkaido. The maximum eclipse was near Bratsk and lasted about 2.5 minutes. The sun was 57 degrees above horizon, gamma had a value of 0.539, and the eclipse was part of Solar Saros 126.

Related eclipses

Solar eclipses 1935–1938

Saros 126

Inex series

Tritos series

Metonic series

Notes

References

 Solar eclipse of June 19, 1936 in Russia
  Images of solar eclipse of June 19, 1936
 Map Kazakhstan
 Observing in Moscow

1936 06 19
1936 in science
1936 06 19
June 1936 events